Krsto Papić (7 December 1933 – 7 February 2013) was a Croatian screenwriter and film director whose career spanned over five decades. He is generally considered among the best directors of former Yugoslavia and the only director from Croatia that can be counted among the Yugoslav Black Wave.

Biography
Papić was born in Vučji Do, near Nikšić in today's Montenegro. His early feature films and documentaries were part of Croatian and Yugoslav New Cinema, and often regarded as Croatian echo of the Black Wave artistic movement that mostly took place within Serbia. Additionally, Papić himself was connected to the Croatian Spring political movement during the early 1970s. He was the member of the Zagreb filmophile circle influenced by the French New Wave, so-called "Hitchcockians", along with film-makers and critics Ante Peterlić, Zoran Tadić, Branko Ivanda, Petar Krelja and centered on film critics Vladimir Vuković and Hrvoje Lisinski. Papić's two best-known early feature films, Lisice and Predstava Hamleta u Mrduši Donjoj, were often attacked from the government sources. Lisice did not get permission to represent Yugoslavia in the Cannes Film Festival, so it entered Quinzaine program in 1970. Izbavitelj was heavily criticised by Stipe Šuvar, who alluded that film's allegory about fascism actually also refers to the communism.

Papić's subsequent feature films were more classical in its narration, but again politically controversial in the last decade of Yugoslavia. Particularly My Uncle's Legacy, critical picture of Yugoslavia's political situation under Titoism during Informbiro period, which was nominated for Golden Globe in 1989, has been surrounded by controversy and political attacks from traditional Party circles and especially Partisan Veterans' organisations, so the production was delayed for couple of years, but achieved due to support of intellectuals, newspapers and Party fractions in the time of disolvement and fight among Party fractions in last years of the Yugoslav federation.

Papić was awarded with Croatia's highest Vladimir Nazor Award for live achievement in cinema in 2006, and with Grand Prix Special des Amériques (for exceptional contribution to the cinematographic art) in 2004.

He died in Zagreb on 7 February 2013 after a battle with stomach cancer, aged 79.

Filmography
1965 – The Key (Ključ) – An omnibus film with sections directed by Vanča Kljaković, Krsto Papić and Antun Vrdoljak; Papić's segment is titled Waiting (Čekati).
1967 – Illusion (Iluzija)
1969 – Handcuffs (Lisice) – entered Quinzaine
1973 – A Performance of Hamlet in the Village of Mrdusa Donja (Predstava Hamleta u selu Mrduša Donja – entered official selection of the Berlin Film Festival
1976 – The Rat Savior (Izbavitelj) – also known as "The Redeemer" - first prize at the Trieste International Science Fiction Film Festival in 1977 and at Fantasporto in 1982
1980 – The Secret of Nikola Tesla (Tajna Nikole Tesle) – in English language
1988 – My Uncle's Legacy (Život sa stricem) – nominated for the Golden Globe Award (Best Foreign Language Film)
1991 – Story from Croatia (Priča iz Hrvatske) – also known under distributor's title Idaho Potato
1999 – When the Dead Start Singing (Kad mrtvi zapjevaju)
2003 – Infection (Infekcija) – remake of The Redeemer
2012– Flower Square (Cvjetni trg)

References

External links

1933 births
2013 deaths
Montenegrin film directors
Croatian film directors
Vladimir Nazor Award winners
Golden Arena for Best Director winners
People from Nikšić
Yugoslav film directors
Deaths from stomach cancer
Deaths from cancer in Croatia
Croatian documentary filmmakers